Marion Martin "Eddie" Edmundson (April 6, 1873 – September 28, 1952), also known as Mays Edmundson, was an American football and baseball coach, minor league baseball player and manager, and lawyer. He served as the head football coach at Westminster College in New Wilmington, Pennsylvania in 1902. Edmundson was also the head baseball coach at the University of Pittsburgh in 1915.

A native of Butler, Pennsylvania, Edmundson was born to Levi H. and Mary M. Edmundson. He was a graduate of Westminster College and the University of Pittsburgh School of Law. Edmundson practiced law in McKeesport, Pennsylvania. He died on September 28, 1952, at his home in West Mifflin, Pennsylvania.

Head coaching record

College football

References

External links
 
 

1873 births
1952 deaths
19th-century players of American football
Braddock Infants players
Hartford Senators players
Minor league baseball managers
Montreal Royals players
Pittsburgh Panthers baseball coaches
Westminster Titans football coaches
Westminster Titans football players
University of Pittsburgh School of Law alumni
Pennsylvania lawyers
People from Butler, Pennsylvania
People from McKeesport, Pennsylvania
People from West Mifflin, Pennsylvania
Coaches of American football from Pennsylvania
Players of American football from Pennsylvania
Baseball coaches from Pennsylvania
Baseball players from Pennsylvania